Darby Generating Station is a 480 megawatt (MW), natural gas peaker plant located in Darby Township, Pickaway County near Mount Sterling, Ohio. The plant is currently owned by Lightstone Generation LLC, a 50-50 joint venture of The Blackstone Group and ArcLight Capital Partners. The plant has six units and began operations in 2001.

Background
The project was first announced in 1999 by Dayton Power & Light (DP&L) to address projected electricity shortages. The first four units of Darby began operations in 2001 with Units 5 and 6 beginning the following year at a cost of $55 million. The total cost of the project was estimated to be at $183 million. The peaker plant is connected by a 345kV power line originating from the former J.M. Stuart Station located in Adams County, Ohio. In 2007, DP&L sold Darby to American Electric Power (AEP) for $102 million. AEP would later sell Darby as a part of $2.17 billion deal to The Blackstone Group and ArcLight Capital Partners in 2016.

See also

 List of power stations in Ohio

References

Energy infrastructure completed in 2001
Energy infrastructure completed in 2002
Buildings and structures in Pickaway County, Ohio
Natural gas-fired power stations in Ohio
2001 establishments in Ohio